Jonathan Maicelo Román (born August 10, 1983) is a Peruvian professional boxer. He has a record of 20 wins (12 KO) and 2 losses (1 KO).

He was a silver medalist at the 2001 Bolivarian Games (Ambato) and at the 2003 Pre-Panamerican Tournament (Tijuana, Mexico), a quarterfinalist at the 2003 Pan American Games (Santo Domingo, Dominican Republic), and a semifinalist at the 2004 Pre-Olympic Tournament (Rio de Janeiro, Brazil).

Professional record

References

External links 
 
 

1983 births
Living people
Peruvian male boxers
Lightweight boxers
Boxers at the 2003 Pan American Games
Pan American Games competitors for Peru